Lenine Cunha (born 4 December 1982) is a Paralympic athlete from Portugal who competes in T20 classification long jump and triple jump events. Cunha represented Portugal at the 2000 Summer Paralympics in Sydney, in both the long jump and the 100 metre sprint. It would be 12 years until Cunha could again compete at the Paralympics due to the T20 classification being removed from the program due to a scandal at the 2000 Games in Sydney. With the reintroduction of the T20 class at the 2012 London Games he finished third to take the bronze medal in the long jump. In 2015 Cunha won the gold medal in the triple jump at the IPC World Championships in Doha.

References 

Paralympic athletes of Portugal
Athletes (track and field) at the 2000 Summer Paralympics
Athletes (track and field) at the 2012 Summer Paralympics
Paralympic bronze medalists for Portugal
Living people
1982 births
Portuguese male long jumpers
Portuguese male triple jumpers
Portuguese male sprinters
Medalists at the 2012 Summer Paralympics
Sportspeople from Vila Nova de Gaia
Paralympic medalists in athletics (track and field)
Athletes (track and field) at the 2020 Summer Paralympics